Star Trek D·A·C (Deathmatch. Assault. Conquest) is a video game inspired by the 2009 Star Trek movie, developed by Naked Sky Entertainment in collaboration with Bad Robot Productions. The title is derived from the game's three modes of play: Deathmatch, Assault, and Conquest. The game was released for the Xbox 360 via the Xbox Live Arcade on May 13, 2009, for the PlayStation 3 (via the PlayStation Network) and Microsoft Windows in November 2009, and for Mac OS X (Intel only) on December 21, 2009.

Gameplay
The game was officially announced at the 2009 Game Developers Conference. 
D-A-C stands for the three modes of play available in the game: Deathmatch, Assault, and Conquest.
The game is more arcade-focused with the title being delivered without a narrative. This, as the developer claims, is to prevent the biggest mistake that movie tie-in games make which is to have the game follow the plot of the film.

It is an online multiplayer with up to 12 players in two teams of 6 and supports 6 unique levels across 3 game modes including a Survival challenge mode (single-player campaign).
The game's levels feature different objectives, and each level has been designed to have a completion time of ten minutes.
It supports cooperative gameplay in which up to 6 players battle against 6 A.I controlled bots.
It plays Federation versus Romulan factions.
It uses the USS Enterprise model from the 2009 film, plus 9 other ships.
Players are able to upgrade their ships during play by collecting various power-ups (each faction has 4 unique special weapons as well).
The game has been built to allow downloadable content which is being released as of November 2009, concurrent with the Blu-ray release of the motion picture.

The PC version was pre-optimized to run in stereoscopic 3D on NVIDIA GeForce 3D Vision.  DDD and iZ3D pre-optimization was arranged by the S-3D Gaming Alliance.
In addition, PC version has some GPU accelerated PhysX effects.

Reception

The game received "mixed" reviews on all platforms according to the review aggregation website Metacritic. IGN's Hilary Goldstein and Daemon Hatfield pointed out in their review of the PC and PlayStation 3 versions: 

In 2016, Den of Geek ranked Star Trek DAC as one of the worst Star Trek games.

References

External links
 

2009 video games
DAC
Windows games
Xbox 360 Live Arcade games
PlayStation Network games
PlayStation 3 games
Space combat simulators
Video games developed in the United States
Video games using PhysX
Multiplayer and single-player video games
Naked Sky Entertainment games